The Voice South Africa is a South African reality singing competition and local version of The Voice first broadcast as The Voice of Holland. Its first season started on 31 January 2016 and proved to be a hit on M-Net. The second season started on 5 February 2017 on the same channel. The third season premiered on 3 February 2019. A fourth season was set for 2020, but has been postponed to a later stage due to the Covid-19 pandemic.

One of the important premises of the show is the quality of the singing talent. Four coaches, themselves popular performing artists, train the talents in their group and occasionally perform with them. Talents are selected in blind auditions, where the coaches cannot see, but only hear the auditioner.

The original coaching panel of the show consists of Kahn Morbee, Lira, Bobby van Jaarsveld, and Karen Zoid. Lungile Radu and Stacy Norman were the original hosts. Season 3 saw a change in the coaching panel, replacing previous coaches and hosts. Lira is the only remaining coach being joined by Afrikaans singer Riana Nel, rapper Riky Rick and rocker Francois Van Coke. Anele Mdoda is the current host.

Coaches and hosts
Shortly after the announcement of the production of The Voice South Africa, the panellists were revealed with Kahn Morbee, Lira, Bobby van Jaarsveld, and Karen Zoid as coaches; and Lungile Radu and Stacy Norman as hosts. The coaching panel and hosts remain unchanged for season 2, which aired in 2017.

On 29 August 2018, M-Net renewed The Voice South Africa for a third season. On 2 November 2018, Anele Mdoda confirmed to become the new host for season 3. Four days later, it was announced that Riky Rick would become a new coach for the third season, followed by Riana Nel on 7 November  and Francois Van Coke on 9 November. On 8 November 2018 Lira confirmed to be returning to the show for her third season as coach.

Timeline of coaches and hosts

Coaches' advisors

Series overview
Colour Key

 Team Kahn
 Team Lira
 Team Bobby
 Team Karen

 Team Riky†
 Team Riana
 Team Francois

Coaches' teams
 Winner
 Runner-up
 Third place
 Fourth place

Winners are in bold, finalists are italicized, and eliminated contestants in small font

Season synopses

Season 1 (2016) 

The first season of The Voice South Africa began airing on 31 January 2016 on M-Net. The season was hosted by Lungile Radu with Stacy Norman as the V-Reporter, and are joined by coaches Kahn Morbee, Lira, Bobby van Jaarsveld, and Karen Zoid. Richard Stirton won the first season on 22 May 2016.

Season 2 (2017) 
The second season of The Voice South Africa  began airing on 5 February 2017 on M-Net. The coaches and hosts remained the same as last season. Eight live shows were conducted this season, with five contestants advanced to the Grand Finale. For the sake of fairness and transparency, M-Net nullified the votes after the Semifinal. As M-Net could not determine with certainty whether misconduct took place regarding paid-for marketing in the previous two weeks, two contestants eliminated in week 4 and 5 were brought back to the show, bringing a total of 7 finalists. Craig Lucas won the season beating fan favorite Josh Ansley.

Season 3 (2019) 
The third season of The Voice South Africa began airing on 3 February 2019 on M-Net, with returning coach Lira and new coaches Riky Rick†, Riana Nel, Francois Van Coke as well as new host Anele Mdoda. Five artists advanced to the Grand Finale, with fan favorite Tasché Burger from team Francois crowned the winner. Sone Joubert and Siki Jo-An Qwazi, both from team Riana, finished in second and third place, respectively, while The PJ Twins and Eon Claude le Roux rounded up the top 5.

References 

2016 in South African television
M-Net original programming
Music competitions in South Africa
South African music television series
South Africa